This list contains notable people associated with Culver Academies in Culver, Indiana, including alumni, former, and current faculty.

Alumni

 Bud Adams, owner of NFL's Tennessee Titans
 Alexander, Crown Prince of Yugoslavia
 Robert Baer, retired CIA officer and author
 Alberto Baillères, Mexico's second-richest man
 Frank Batten, founder of Landmark Communications, The Weather Channel and weather.com
 Dierks Bentley, musician 
 Pablo Bernal, Spanish track cyclist
  Michael Brun, electronic musician and DJ
 Quico Canseco, former U.S. Representative (R-TX)
 Enrico Caruso Jr., actor, singer, son of renowned operatic tenor Enrico Caruso
 Sam Cohn, talent agent
 Elgin English Crull, City Manager of Dallas, Texas at time of JFK assassination
 Joseph T. Curry, member of the Louisiana House of Representatives from 1930 to 1944; planter in Tensas Parish
 Luther Davis, playwright and screenwriter
 Kevin Dean, former NHL hockey player
 Jonathan Dever, member of Ohio House of Representatives
 Vadhir Derbez , Actor and Singer
 Mario Dominguez, Champ Car driver
 Nic Dowd, NHL hockey player
 Jack Eckerd, founder Eckerd Pharmacy
 Molly Engstrom, hockey player for Team USA
 Eugene C. Eppley, hotel magnate
 Reuben H. Fleet, founder of Consolidated Aircraft, aviation pioneer
 George Foreman III, professional boxer
 Ernest K. Gann, aviator and writer
 Blake Geoffrion, hockey player
 Horace Heidt, pianist and big-band leader
 James A. Henderson, chairman of Cummins, Inc.
 Mitch Henderson, basketball head coach, Princeton
 Elwood Hillis, US House of Representatives, grandson of Elwood Haynes
 Hal Holbrook, actor
 Tim Holt, actor
 Robert J. Huber, Michigan politician and businessman
 Michael Huffington, former U. S. Congressman from California and film producer
 Lamar Hunt, founder of NFL's Kansas City Chiefs
 Bill Koch, businessman, sailor, and collector; his boat won America's Cup in 1992
 Russell Lee, photographer and photojournalist, best known for work for Farm Security Administration (FSA)
 John-Michael Liles, NHL hockey player and 2006 Olympian, Toronto Maple Leafs
 Joshua Logan, playwright, screenwriter and stage/film director
 Daniel Manion, judge
 George Mastics, former member of Ohio House of Representatives, current County Commissioner in Palm Beach, Florida
 Adolphe Menjou, actor
 Edmund H. North, Oscar-winning screenwriter
 Richard O'Neill, writer
 Walter O'Malley (1903–1979), owner of baseball's Brooklyn Dodgers, who moved team to Los Angeles, California in 1958
 Charles I. Murray, Brigadier General, USMC. A recipient of Navy Cross and Army Distinguished Service Cross.
 Stephen A. Orthwein, polo player
 Emilio Azcárraga Milmo, American-Mexican businessman and publisher
 Eugene Pallette, actor
 Roger Penske, owner of Penske Corporation
 William Perry, United States Secretary of Defense
 Barry Richter, former NHL hockey player
 George R. Roberts, financier, partner in KKR
 Mark Salling, actor, musician, played "Puck" on TV show Glee
 Jon Scieszka, author
 Gene Siskel, film critic
 Dan Sullivan, U.S. senator for Alaska
 Tal Smith, Major League Baseball executive, retired president of Houston Astros, marathon runner
 Herbert Sobel, lieutenant colonel, U.S. Army, World War II veteran and first commander of Easy Company, 2nd battalion, 506th P.I.R. with 101st Airborne division
 Juergen Sommer, professional soccer player and coach
 Burr Steers, actor and director
 George Steinbrenner, former owner of New York Yankees
 Hal Steinbrenner, former part-owner of New York Yankees
 Gary Suter, former NHL hockey player
 Ryan Suter, hockey player, NHL and Team USA
 Jorge Alberto Uribe, Colombian politician, diplomat and businessman 
 Miles D. White, Chairman and CEO, Abbott Labs
 James C. Wofford, Olympic equestrian
 Robert R. Young, financier
 Jay Zeamer, Jr., Medal of Honor recipient, U.S. Army Air Force of World War II
 Brennan Kapcheck, Professional Hockey Player

Faculty
Hillard Bell Huntington
James Garesche Ord
Bob Peck
Charles DuVal Roberts
John Shirley Wood

Fictional
Tom Brown of Culver, movie character

References

Culver
 
Culver Academies people